Nestor El Maestro (born Nestor Jevtić, ; on 25 March 1983) is a Serbian-born English football manager.

Personal life
Born to Serbian parents who later relocated to West Sussex, England when he was eight years old, he changed his surname to El Maestro at the age of 18, after having it changed once before in his teenage years, due to himself identifying as British and in an attempt to distance himself from his Serbian roots because of his native country's role in the Yugoslav Wars.

Managerial career

Spartak Trnava
In May 2017, El Maestro signed a 2−year contract with Slovak club Spartak Trnava, taking over as their manager from the new season. In his first season as a manager, he led them to a historic league title for the first time in 45 years.

CSKA Sofia
In June 2018, he signed a contract with Bulgarian side CSKA Sofia. He was sacked in February 2019, despite reaching 45 points after 20 games in the Parva Liga.

SK Sturm Graz
On 12 June 2019, it was announced that El Maestro has signed a 2–year contract with the Austrian side SK Sturm Graz. He was sacked on 25 June 2020 after a series of seven losses in eight games. During the 29 games under El Maestro's tenure, the team reached a disappointing 37 points.

Al-Taawoun
On 12 March 2021, he was appointed as the manager of Saudi Pro League club Al-Taawoun. On 22 August 2021, he was sacked by Al-Taawoun.

Göztepe
On 8 September 2021, Süper Lig side Göztepe S.K. announced agreement with El Maestro, which was contracted on 2 seasons.

Managerial statistics

Honours

Manager

Spartak Trnava
Slovak Super Liga: 2017–18

Individual
 Slovak Super Liga Manager of the season: 2017–18

References

External links
FC Spartak Trnava official club profile

1983 births
Living people
Serbian football managers
FC Spartak Trnava managers
Sportspeople from Belgrade
FC Schalke 04 non-playing staff
Hamburger SV non-playing staff
Hannover 96 non-playing staff
FK Austria Wien non-playing staff
PFC CSKA Sofia managers
FK Austria Wien managers
SK Sturm Graz managers
Al-Taawoun FC managers
Saudi Professional League managers
Serbian expatriate football managers
Serbian expatriate sportspeople in Germany
Expatriate football managers in Germany
Serbian expatriate sportspeople in Austria
Expatriate football managers in Austria
Serbian expatriate sportspeople in Bulgaria
Expatriate football managers in Bulgaria
Serbian expatriate sportspeople in Slovakia
Expatriate football managers in Slovakia
Serbian expatriate sportspeople in Saudi Arabia
Expatriate football managers in Saudi Arabia